Syandan Patrika is an Indian Bengali language daily newspaper published from Tripura, India. It was founded and is currently managed by Subal Kumar Dey.

History
Syandan Patrika was first published as a weekly newspaper on 19 August 1980.  It became a daily newspaper in 1978.

Company

It has over 60 journalists and over 15 photojournalists in the state.  The Photo Editor and Manager of Syandan Patrika is Arindam Dey, son of Subal Kumar Dey.  The headquarters is in Agartala, Tripura, India, 12 km south of Agartala Airport.  It also has offices in Kolkata, New Delhi, Bangalore, Ahmedabad, Guwahati, Mumbai, Chennai, Kanpur, Punjab, Haryana, Uttarakhand, Pune and Kanpur.

Policy
The paper's editorial line is politically and economically liberal, and it is known for its anti-establishment tone.  The paper has often carried investigative reports.  One of its campaigns contributed to the passage of the Right to Information Act of 2005.

Syandan TV 
Subal Kumar Dey founded a news channel, Syandan TV, on 17 January 2022. It is the sister project or company of Syandan Patrika. But, it is facing some troubles now for its protesting nature.

See also 
 List of journalists killed in India
 List of Indian journalists
 Sudip Datta Bhaumik

References

External links 
Homepage of Syandan Patrika
Online Bengali Newspaper
Why this Comrade hasn’t lost—yet
Media Directory
https://m.thewire.in/article/media/another-journalist-shot-dead-tripura

Bengali-language newspapers published in India
Mass media in Tripura
Newspapers published in Tripura